The Venetian Affair may refer to:

The Venetian Affair, 1963 novel by Scottish-American author Helen MacInnes
The Venetian Affair (film), 1967 American film